Önder Deniz Kolgu (born 28 January 1974) is a retired Turkish footballer and later manager.

References

1974 births
Living people
Turkish footballers
Orduspor footballers
Bursaspor footballers
MKE Ankaragücü footballers
Göztepe S.K. footballers
Diyarbakırspor footballers
Manisaspor footballers
Khazar Lankaran FK players
Sakaryaspor footballers
Kocaelispor footballers
İstanbulspor footballers
Dardanelspor footballers
Alibeyköyspor footballers
Bozüyükspor footballers
Turkish expatriate footballers
Expatriate footballers in Azerbaijan
Turkish expatriate sportspeople in Azerbaijan
Turkish football managers
Sakaryaspor managers
Çanakkale Dardanelspor managers
Kartalspor managers
Association footballers not categorized by position